Anuschka Gläser (born 19 August 1969) is a German former pair skater. She is a three-time German national champion, twice with Stefan Pfrengle and once with Axel Rauschenbach. Gläser and Rauschenbach represented Germany at the 1994 Winter Olympics.

Results

With Axel Rauschenbach

With Stefan Pfrengle

References

External links 
 

1969 births
Living people
German female pair skaters
Olympic figure skaters of Germany
Figure skaters at the 1994 Winter Olympics
Sportspeople from Stuttgart